Present is the second extended play (EP) of South Korean pop duo Super Junior-D&E, a subgroup of the boy band Super Junior. The EP was released on April 1, 2015 under Avex Trax in Japan.

Track listing
CD1

DVD
 "Saturday Night" Music Video
 "Skeleton" Music Video
 "Saturday Night" Music Video Making Clip
 "Present" JK Making Clip

Chart

Awards

References

External links
 Official Japanese Avex website of Super Junior-D&E

Super Junior albums
SM Entertainment albums
Avex Group albums
2015 albums